Coscinia bifasciata is a moth of the family Erebidae. It was described by Jules Pierre Rambur in 1832. It is found on Corsica and Sardinia.

Adults are on wing from June to August in one or two generations per year.

The larvae feed on Calluna, Erica, Vaccinium, Genista, Taraxacum and Plantago species. The species overwinters in the larval stage.

References

External links

Lepiforum e.V.

Callimorphina
Moths described in 1832
Moths of Europe
Taxa named by Jules Pierre Rambur